Bår Stenvik (born 18 November 1976) is a Norwegian non-fiction writer.

He hails from Namdalseid. He wrote the children's non-fiction books Dataspill (2011) and Ti utrulege oppfinningar (2020), the non-fiction books Skitt (2011), Bløff (2014) and Å bli en annen (2016). In 2011 he also issued the novel Informasjonen, whose movie rights were bought by Bulldozer Film. He followed up with Det store spillet (2020).

References

1976 births
Living people
People from Nord-Trøndelag
Norwegian non-fiction writers
Norwegian novelists